Baikiaea insignis is a species of legume in the family Fabaceae.

Baikiaea insignis ranges through the Guineo-Congolian region into eastern Africa, from Senegal through Nigeria, Cameroon, Equatorial Guinea, Gabon, Republic of the Congo, Democratic Republic of the Congo, northern Angola, Uganda, Kenya, Rwanda, Burundi, and Tanzania.

Baikiaea insignis is found in a range of plant communities, from sea level up to 1,800 metres elevation. It is found in rainforests,  periodically flooded riparian forests with Uapaca heudelotii and Irvingia smithii, gallery forests, upland and mountain forests, and swamp forests.

Baikiaea insignis subsp. minor, commonly known as Nkobakoba or Nkoba, is a subspecies found in Bukoba district of Tanzania and the South Buddu forests of Uganda. B. insignis minor and Afrocarpus dawei are the dominant canopy trees in Minziro and Sango Bay forests, a distinctive swamp forest community found along the lower reaches of the Kagera River west of Lake Victoria, on the border of Tanzania and Uganda.

Gallery

References

Detarioideae
Flora of Uganda
Flora of Tanzania
Trees of Africa